Agyneta is a genus of  dwarf spiders that was first described by J. E. Hull in 1911.

Species
 it contains 200 species and one subspecies:

A. adami (Millidge, 1991) – Brazil
A. affinis (Kulczyński, 1898) – Europe, Russia (Europe to Far East), China
A. affinisoides Tanasevitch, 1984 – Russia (Middle Siberia to Far East)
A. albinotata (Millidge, 1991) – Colombia
A. alboguttata (Jocqué, 1985) – Comoros
A. albomaculata (Baert, 1990) – Ecuador (Galapagos Is.)
A. allosubtilis Loksa, 1965 – North America, Russia (Europe to Far East), Mongolia
A. alpica Tanasevitch, 2000 – France, Switzerland, Austria
A. amersaxatilis Saaristo & Koponen, 1998 – USA, Canada, Russia (north-east Siberia)
A. angulata (Emerton, 1882) – USA, Canada
A. aquila Dupérré, 2013 – Canada
A. arida (Baert, 1990) – Ecuador (Galapagos Is.)
A. arietans (O. Pickard-Cambridge, 1873) – Germany, Poland
A. atra (Millidge, 1991) – Venezuela
A. barfoot Dupérré, 2013 – USA
A. barrowsi (Chamberlin & Ivie, 1944) – USA, Canada
A. bermudensis (Strand, 1906) – Bermuda
A. birulai (Kulczyński, 1908) – Russia (Urals to Far East), China
A. birulaioides Wunderlich, 1995 – Ukraine, Kazakhstan, Russia (South Siberia), Mongolia
A. boninensis (Saito, 1982) – Japan
A. breviceps Hippa & Oksala, 1985 – Finland
A. brevipes (Keyserling, 1886) – USA
A. brevis (Millidge, 1991) – Peru
A. bronx Dupérré, 2013 – USA
A. brusnewi (Kulczyński, 1908) – Russia (Urals to Far East)
A. bucklei Dupérré, 2013 – USA, Canada
A. bueko Wunderlich, 1983 – Nepal
A. bulavintsevi Tanasevitch, 2016 – Russia (Europe, north-eastern Siberia)
A. canariensis Wunderlich, 1987 – Canary Is., Savage Is., Madeira
A. castanea (Millidge, 1991) – Chile
A. catalina Dupérré, 2013 – USA
A. cauta (O. Pickard-Cambridge, 1903) – Europe, Russia (Europe to South Siberia), Kyrgyzstan
A. chiricahua Dupérré, 2013 – USA
A. cincta (Millidge, 1991) – Colombia
A. collina (Millidge, 1991) – Colombia
A. conigera (O. Pickard-Cambridge, 1863) – Europe, Caucasus, Russia (Europe to Far East), Kazakhstan
A. crawfordi Dupérré, 2013 – USA
A. crista Dupérré, 2013 – USA
A. cuneata Tanasevitch, 2014 – Russia (Far East)
A. curvata (Bosmans, 1979) – Kenya
A. dactylis (Tao, Li & Zhu, 1995) – China
A. danielbelangeri Dupérré, 2013 – USA, Canada
A. darrelli Dupérré, 2013 – USA, Canada
A. decora (O. Pickard-Cambridge, 1871) (type) – USA (Alaska), Canada, Europe, Russia (Europe to Middle Siberia)
A. decorata (Chamberlin & Ivie, 1944) – USA
A. decurvis (Tao, Li & Zhu, 1995) – China
A. delphina Dupérré, 2013 – USA
A. dentifera (Locket, 1968) – Nigeria, Angola
A. depigmentata Wunderlich, 2008 – Azores
A. discolor (Millidge, 1991) – Colombia
A. disjuncta (Millidge, 1991) – Colombia
A. dynica Saaristo & Koponen, 1998 – USA, Canada
A. emertoni (Roewer, 1942) – Canada
A. equestris (L. Koch, 1881) – Europe
A. erinacea Dupérré, 2013 – USA
A. evadens (Chamberlin, 1925) – USA, Canada
A. exigua (Russell-Smith, 1992) – Cameroon, Nigeria
A. fabra (Keyserling, 1886) – USA, Canada
A. falcata (Li & Zhu, 1995) – China
A. fillmorana (Chamberlin, 1919) – USA, Canada
A. flandroyae (Jocqué, 1985) – Comoros
A. flavipes (Ono, 1991) – Japan
A. flax Dupérré, 2013 – USA
A. flibuscrocus Dupérré, 2013 – USA
A. floridana (Banks, 1896) – USA
A. fratrella (Chamberlin, 1919) – USA
A. frigida (Millidge, 1991) – Colombia
A. fusca (Millidge, 1991) – Peru
A. fuscipalpa (C. L. Koch, 1836) – Europe, North Africa, Caucasus, Russia (Europe to South Siberia), Central Asia
A. gagnei (Gertsch, 1973) – Hawaii
A. galapagosensis (Baert, 1990) – Ecuador (Galapagos Is.), Brazil
A. girardi Dupérré, 2013 – USA, Canada
A. gracilipes (Holm, 1968) – Cameroon, Gabon, Congo, Kenya, Angola
A. grandcanyon Dupérré, 2013 – USA
A. gulosa (L. Koch, 1869) – Europe, Russia (Europe to East Siberia), Japan
A. habra (Locket, 1968) – Africa
A. hedini Paquin & Dupérré, 2009 – USA
A. himalaya Tanasevitch, 2018 – Nepal
A. ignorata (Saito, 1982) – Japan
A. inermis Tanasevitch, 2019 – Italy, Greece
A. innotabilis (O. Pickard-Cambridge, 1863) – Europe
A. insolita (Locket & Russell-Smith, 1980) – Nigeria
A. insulana Tanasevitch, 2000 – Russia (Sakhalin, Kurile Is.)
A. iranica Tanasevitch, 2011 – Iran, Turkmenistan
A. issaqueena Dupérré, 2013 – USA
A. jacksoni (Braendegaard, 1937) – USA, Canada, Greenland
A. jiriensis Wunderlich, 1983 – Nepal
A. kaszabi (Loksa, 1965) – Kazakhstan, Russia (South Siberia), Mongolia
A. kopetdaghensis Tanasevitch, 1989 – Iran, Turkmenistan, Kazakhstan
A. laimonasi Tanasevitch, 2006 – Russia (Far East)
A. larva (Locket, 1968) – Angola
A. lauta (Millidge, 1991) – Peru
A. ledfordi Dupérré, 2013 – USA
A. leucophora (Chamberlin & Ivie, 1944) – USA
A. levii Tanasevitch, 1984 – Russia (West to South Siberia)
A. levis (Locket, 1968) – Angola
A. lila (Dönitz & Strand, 1906) – Japan
A. llanoensis (Gertsch & Davis, 1936) – USA
A. longipes (Chamberlin & Ivie, 1944) – USA
A. lophophor (Chamberlin & Ivie, 1933) – USA, Canada
A. luctuosa (Millidge, 1991) – Venezuela
A. manni (Crawford & Edwards, 1989) – USA
A. maritima (Emerton, 1919) – Russia (Middle Siberia to Far East), Mongolia, Canada, USA (Alaska)
A. martensi Tanasevitch, 2006 – China
A. mediocris (Millidge, 1991) – Colombia
A. mendosa (Millidge, 1991) – Colombia
A. merretti (Locket, 1968) – Angola
A. mesasiatica Tanasevitch, 2000 – France (Corsica), Italy, Russia (Caucasus), Azerbaijan, Iran, Central Asia
A. metatarsialis Tanasevitch, 2014 – Russia (South Siberia)
A. metropolis (Russell-Smith & Jocqué, 1986) – Kenya
A. micaria (Emerton, 1882) – Southeastern United States, north to Ontario and west to Texas
A. milleri (Thaler, Buchar & Kůrka, 1997) – Czech Rep., Slovakia
A. mingshengzhui (Barrion, Barrion-Dupo & Heong, 2013) – China
A. miniata Dupérré, 2013 – USA
A. minorata (Chamberlin & Ivie, 1944) – USA
A. mollis (O. Pickard-Cambridge, 1871) – USA (Alaska), Canada, Europe, Morocco, Caucasus, Russia (Europe to Far East), China, Japan
A. mongolica (Loksa, 1965) – Mongolia, Russia (Far East)
A. montana (Millidge, 1991) – Ecuador
A. montivaga (Millidge, 1991) – Venezuela
A. mossica (Schikora, 1993) – Europe (without southern), Russia (Europe to West Siberia)
A. natalensis (Jocqué, 1984) – South Africa
A. nigra (Oi, 1960) – Russia (Middle Siberia to Far East), Mongolia, China, Korea, Japan
A. nigripes (Simon, 1884) – Canada, Greenland, Europe, Russia (Europe to Far East), Pakistan
Agyneta n. nivicola (Simon, 1929) – France
A. obscura (Denis, 1950) – Congo, Tanzania
A. oculata (Millidge, 1991) – Peru
A. okefenokee Dupérré, 2013 – USA
A. olivacea (Emerton, 1882) – North America, Europe, Russia (Europe to Far East), Mongolia
A. opaca (Millidge, 1991) – Colombia
A. ordinaria (Chamberlin & Ivie, 1947) – USA, Canada
A. orites (Thorell, 1875) – Spain, Alps (France, Italy, Switzerland, Austria, Germany)
A. pakistanica Tanasevitch, 2011 – Pakistan
A. palgongsanensis (Paik, 1991) – Russia (Far East), China, Korea
A. palustris (Li & Zhu, 1995) – China
A. panthera Dupérré, 2013 – USA
A. paquini Dupérré, 2013 – USA
A. paraprosecta Tanasevitch, 2010 – United Arab Emirates
A. parva (Banks, 1896) – USA
A. perspicua Dupérré, 2013 – USA, Canada
A. picta (Chamberlin & Ivie, 1944) – USA
A. pinicola Gnelitsa, 2014 – Ukraine
A. pinta (Baert, 1990) – Ecuador (Galapagos Is.)
A. pistrix Dupérré, 2013 – USA
A. plagiata (Banks, 1929) – Panama
A. platnicki Dupérré, 2013 – USA
A. pogonophora (Locket, 1968) – Angola, Seychelles
A. prima (Millidge, 1991) – Colombia
A. propinqua (Millidge, 1991) – Peru, Brazil
A. propria (Millidge, 1991) – Ecuador
A. prosectes (Locket, 1968) – St. Helena, Africa
A. prosectoides (Locket & Russell-Smith, 1980) – Cameroon, Nigeria
A. protrudens (Chamberlin & Ivie, 1933) – USA, Canada
A. proxima (Millidge, 1991) – Colombia
A. pseudofuscipalpis Wunderlich, 1983 – Nepal
A. pseudorurestris Wunderlich, 1980 – Mediterranean
A. pseudosaxatilis Tanasevitch, 1984 – Russia (West Siberia to Far East), Kazakhstan
A. punctata Wunderlich, 1995 – Greece, Turkey
A. ramosa Jackson, 1912 – Europe, Caucasus, Russia (Europe to South Siberia)
A. regina (Chamberlin & Ivie, 1944) – USA
A. ressli (Wunderlich, 1973) – Germany, Switzerland, Austria, Greece
A. ripariensis Tanasevitch, 1984 – Russia (Europe to Far East)
A. rufidorsa (Denis, 1961) – France
A. rugosa Wunderlich, 1992 – Azores
A. rurestris (C. L. Koch, 1836) – Europe, Turkey, Caucasus, Russia (Europe to South Siberia), Central Asia, China, Korea
A. saaristoi Tanasevitch, 2000 – Russia (Europe to South Siberia), Kazakhstan
A. sandia Dupérré, 2013 – USA
A. saxatilis (Blackwall, 1844) – Europe
A. semipallida (Chamberlin & Ivie, 1944) – USA
A. serrata (Emerton, 1909) – USA, Canada
A. serratichelis (Denis, 1964) – Sudan
A. serratula Wunderlich, 1995 – Mongolia
A. sheffordiana Dupérré & Paquin, 2007 – Northeastern Canada (Manitoba, New Brunswick, Nova Scotia, Ontario, Quebec)
A. silvae (Millidge, 1991) – Peru
A. similis (Kulczyński, 1926) – Iceland, Finland, Russia (Europe to Far East), Kazakhstan
A. simplex (Emerton, 1926) – USA, Canada
A. simplicitarsis (Simon, 1884) – Europe, Russia (Europe to South Siberia), Kazakhstan
A. spicula Dupérré, 2013 – USA
A. spinifera Dupérré, 2013 – Kenya and Tanzania
A. straminicola (Millidge, 1991) – Colombia, Ecuador
A. subnivalis Tanasevitch, 1989 – Central Asia
A. subtilis (O. Pickard-Cambridge, 1863) – Europe, Russia (Europe to South Siberia), China
A. suecica Holm, 1950 – Sweden, Finland, Russia (Europe)
A. tenuipes (Ono, 2007) – Japan
A. tianschanica Tanasevitch, 1989 – Kyrgyzstan
A. tibialis Tanasevitch, 2005 – Russia (Europe to South Siberia)
A. tincta (Jocqué, 1985) – Comoros
A. transversa (Banks, 1898) – Mexico
A. trifurcata Hippa & Oksala, 1985 – Finland, Russia (Middle Siberia to Far East)
A. tuberculata Dupérré, 2013 – USA
A. unicornis (Tao, Li & Zhu, 1995) – China
A. unimaculata (Banks, 1892) – USA, Canada
A. usitata (Locket, 1968) – Nigeria, Angola
A. uta (Chamberlin, 1920) – USA
A. uzbekistanica Tanasevitch, 1984 – Central Asia
A. vera Wunderlich, 1976 – Australia (Queensland)
A. vinki Dupérré, 2013 – USA
A. watertoni Dupérré, 2013 – Canada
A. yukona Dupérré, 2013 – Canada
A. yulungiensis Wunderlich, 1983 – Nepal

The World Spider Catalogue documents the following names as nomina dubia, meaning that they are of unknown or dubious application.
 Agyneta lugubris (Blackwall, 1834)
 Agyneta resima (L. Koch, 1881)
 Agyneta tenera (Menge, 1869)

See also
 List of Linyphiidae species

References

 
Araneomorphae genera
Cosmopolitan spiders
Linyphiidae